Dichomeris terracocta is a moth in the family Gelechiidae. It was described by Walsingham in 1911.

References

terracocta
moths described in 1911